The Men's 15 km classical interval start was part of the FIS Nordic World Ski Championships 2009's events held in Liberec, Czech Republic. The race went underway on 20 February 2009 at 13:00 CET. A 10 km qualifying race took place on 23 February at 11:00 CET. The defending world champion was Norway's Lars Berger

Results

Qualification

References

FIS Nordic World Ski Championships 2009